La Unión is a city and commune of the Ranco Province in the Los Ríos Region in Chile. It is situated approximately 40 km north of Osorno and 80 km southeast of Valdivia. Covering an area of 2,136.7 km2, it has a population of 36,447, of which 25,615 are considered part of the urban population, according to the 2012 census. The commune derived its name from the confluence of the Llollelhue and Radimadi rivers.

La Unión was founded in 1821 during the government of Bernardo O'Higgins, to secure sovereignty over the Central Valley south of Valdivia. It is a major centre for milk production; COLUN is the main milk and dairy product producer in the zone. The commune is covered in forest to the west of the city and the east is dominated by agricultural landscapes spanning Los Llanos. Alerce Costero National Park lies in the western mountains.

The city served until 2001 as a dormitory town for the coal mines of Catamutún.

Demographics
Of these, 25,615 (64.9%) lived in urban areas and 13,832 (35.1%) in rural areas. The population grew by 1.8% (707 persons) between the 1992 and 2002 censuses.

Administration

As a commune, La Unión is a third-level administrative division of Chile administered by a municipal council, headed by an alcalde who is directly elected every four years. The 2012-2016 alcalde is María Angelica Astudillo Mautz.

Within the electoral divisions of Chile, La Unión is represented in the Chamber of Deputies by Mr. Enrique Jaramillo  (PDC) and Mr. Gastón Von Mühlenbrock (UDI) as part of the 54th electoral district, together with Panguipulli, Los Lagos, Futrono, Lago Ranco, Río Bueno and Paillaco.

Education
Deutsche Schule La Unión was at one time recognized as an overseas German school by the West German government.

References

External links
  Municipality of La Unión

Populated places in Ranco Province
Capitals of Chilean provinces
Populated places established in 1821
Communes of Chile